English words of Sámi origin are relatively rare, having usually entered the English language via some other language.

Words loaned to English
Some words specific to the Arctic environment have been loaned to English, specifically: (archaic) morse ('walrus') ← Sámi morša (via Slavic); and tundra ← Kildin Sámi tūnndra 'to the treeless plain' (via Russian). In Kildin Sámi, the word for tundra is tūndâr (tūnndra is in the illative case or the diminutive derivative). Words from Northern Sámi include Duodji, Sieidi and Yoik.

See also
List of English words of foreign origin
List of English words of Finnish origin
Uralic languages

References
Johanna Laakso (toim.). Uralilaiset kansat. WSOY 1991.

Sami
Sámi languages
Sámi-related lists